Sport Vereniging Britannia is an Aruban football club, which currently plays in Aruba's first division. They are based in Piedra Plat.

History
SV Britannia was founded in 1958, when an official football team was organised for the local youngsters in Piedra Plat and vicinity. They played their first game in 1960, when beating Vitesse Cashero 3–1. The first board members were; Daniel "Vale" Croes, Henry "Henriche" Croes, Ripoldo Croes, Roland "Rolly" Bareño, Alfredo "Fechi" Bareño, Serapio "Jati" Weller, Joanquin Werleman, Hipolito "Poli" Pereira and Marcolino "Cholin" Erasmus.

SV Britannia promoted to the highest division (Division di Honor) in 2001. They clinched the league title so far in 2004–05, 2008–09, 2009–10, 2012–13 and subsequently took part in the 2006, 2007 and 2009 CFU Club Championship in an attempt to qualify for the CONCACAF Champions Cup.

International games
Oct 25, 2001 – SV Britannia vs  Curaçao B Selection 3–3
June 28, 2002 – SV Britannia vs  Atlético Nacional 2–4
July 16, 2003 – SV Britannia vs  Carabobo 2–5
Sept 27, 2005 – SV Britannia vs  Robinhood 1–2
Sept 29, 2005 – SV Britannia vs  Robinhood 0–2
April 21, 2006 – SV Britannia vs  CSD Barber (Curaçao) 2–4
Dec 10, 2006 – SV Britannia vs  New Vibes (St. Thomas) 1–1
Dec 12, 2006 – SV Britannia vs  San Juan Jabloteh 0–8
Dec 14, 2006 – SV Britannia vs  SAP 1–7
May 2, 2007 – SV Britannia vs  Carabobo 1–2
March 22, 2009 – SV Britannia vs  Cavaly 0–5
March 29, 2009 – SV Britannia vs  Cavaly 0–1
June 5, 2009 – SV Britannia vs  Centro Dominquito 0–5
June 7, 2009 – SV Britannia vs  FCS Nacional 2–4
May 20, 2010 – SV Britannia vs  Venezuela Selection 2–4
June 18, 2010 – SV Britannia vs  Real Madrid Miami Soccer 2–2
Aug 4, 2016 – SV Britannia vs  Deportivo Pereira 1–1
May 20, 2019 – SV Britannia vs  Deportivo Pereira 1–3 U-20
July 22, 2021 – SV Britannia vs  Punta Cana FC 2–2

Staff members

 D.T.:  Jose Lius "Chelique" Duran
 D.T.Ass:  Gregory Tromp
 D.T. Ass :  Renier Paraez
 D.T. Ass / U-20 Trainer :  Sebas Mira
 Condition trainer :  Luis Murillo
 Fisio:  Gustavo Rojas
 Team manager :  Jonathan Tromp
 Administration :  Lisette Werlelman
 President :  Cedric Werleman

Achievements
Aruban Division di Honor: 4
 2004–05, 2008–09, 2009–10, 2013–14
Torneo Copa Betico Croes: 7
 2007–08, 2008–09, 2009–10, 2010–11, 2012–13, 2014–15, 2016–17

2007–08 : SV Britannia 3–2 SV Deportivo Nacional
2008–09 : SV Britannia 1–1 SV Estrella (4–3 pk)
2009–10 : SV Britannia 2–0 SV La Fama
2010–11 : SV Britannia 4–1 SV Bubali
2012–13 : SV Britannia 1–0 SV Racing Club Aruba
2014–15 : SV Britannia 5–0 SV Bubali
2015–16 : SV Racing Club Aruba 3–1 SV Britannia
2016–17 : SV Britannia 2–1 SV Dakota

Performance in CONCACAF competitions
CFU Club Championship: 2 appearances
Best: 2006 Group-Stage – 1 pt

Current squad

Notable former players 

 Kendrick Dania
 Eldrick Celaire
 Jonathan Lake
 Elvin Poppen
 Lesley Felomina
 Erwin Croes
 Rodney Lake
 Mark Mackay
 Theric Ruiz
 Juan Valdez
 Robbie Croes

External links

Football clubs in Aruba
Association football clubs established in 1958
1958 establishments in Aruba